Hemicrepidius amoenus is a species of click beetle belonging to the family Elateridae. It was first described by Philippi in 1861.

References

Beetles described in 1861
amoenus